Abram Fedorovich Ioffe (– 14 October 1960) was a prominent Soviet physicist. He received the Stalin Prize (1942), the Lenin Prize (1960) (posthumously), and the Hero of Socialist Labor (1955). Ioffe was an expert in various areas of solid state physics and electromagnetism. He established research laboratories for radioactivity, superconductivity, and nuclear physics, many of which became independent institutes.

Biography

Ioffe was born into a middle-class Jewish family in the small town of Romny, Russian Empire (now in Sumy Oblast, Ukraine). After graduating from Saint Petersburg State Institute of Technology in 1902, he spent two years as an assistant to Wilhelm Röntgen in his Munich laboratory. Ioffe completed his Ph.D. at Munich University in 1905. His dissertation studied the electrical conductivity/electrical stress of dielectric crystals.

After 1906, Ioffe worked in the Saint Petersburg (from 1924 Leningrad) Polytechnical Institute where he eventually became a professor. In 1911 he (independently of Millikan) determined the charge of an electron.  In this experiment, the microparticles of zinc metal were irradiated with ultraviolet light to eject the electrons. The charged microparticles were then balanced in an electric field against gravity so that their charges could be determined (published in 1913). In 1911 Ioffe converted from Judaism to Lutheranism and married a non-Jewish woman. In 1913 he attained the title of Magister of Philosophy and in 1915 Doctor of Physics. In 1918 he became head of Physics and Technology division in State Institute of Roentgenology and Radiology. This division became the Leningrad Physico-Technical Institute (LPTI) in 1917 and eventually the Ioffe Institute.

In the early 1930s, there was a critical need in the Air Defense Forces of the Red Army for means of detecting invading aircraft. A number of research institutes were involved with radiolokatory (radio-location) techniques. The Russian Academy of Sciences called a conference in January 1934 to assess this technology. Ioffe organized this conference, then published a journal report, disclosing to researchers throughout the world the science and technology that would ultimately be called radar.
 
When the Soviet atomic bomb project began in 1942, Ioffe was asked to lead the technical effort, but refused the job on the grounds that he was too old. He saw great promise in the young Igor Kurchatov, and placed him in charge of the first nuclear laboratory. During Joseph Stalin's campaign against the so-called "rootless cosmopolitans" (Jews), in 1950 Ioffe was made redundant from his position of the Director of LPTI and from the Board of Directors. In 1952–1954 he headed the Laboratory of Semiconductors of Academy of Sciences of the USSR, which in 1954 was reorganized as the Institute of Semiconductors. Following Ioffe's death, in 1960 the LPTI was renamed the Ioffe Physico-Technical Institute and is one of Russia's leading research centers.

Ioffe's students include Aleksandr Aleksandrov, Pyotr Kapitsa, Isaak Kikoin, Igor Kurchatov, Yakov Frenkel, Nikolay Semyonov, Léon Theremin, Boris Davydov, and Lev Artsimovich. Ioffe asked Ernest Rutherford to accept Pyotr Kapitsa to Cavendish Laboratory at the University of Cambridge.

Commemoration 
 The lunar crater Ioffe is named after him.
 Ioffe Physico-Technical Institute carries his name.
 The Russian oceanographic and Polar research vessel Akademik Ioffe is named after him.
 The asteroid 5222 Ioffe is named after him.

Patents
  "Translating device"
 U.S. Patent on the piezoelectric effect

References

External links
 A. Joffe, Physics and Technology
 Annotated bibliography for Abram Ioffe from the Alsos Digital Library for Nuclear Issues
 Short biography by the Russian Ioffe institute

1880 births
1960 deaths
Converts to Lutheranism from Judaism
Full Members of the Russian Academy of Sciences (1917–1925)
Full Members of the USSR Academy of Sciences
Heroes of Socialist Labour
Inventors from the Russian Empire
Physicists from the Russian Empire
Jewish Russian scientists
Jewish Ukrainian scientists
Jewish Russian physicists
Lenin Prize winners
People from Poltava Governorate
People from Romny
Academic staff of Peter the Great St. Petersburg Polytechnic University
Russian Lutherans
Saint Petersburg State Institute of Technology alumni
Soviet inventors
Soviet physicists
Stalin Prize winners
Ukrainian Jews
Fellows of the American Physical Society